Australobius is a genus of centipedes in the family Lithobiidae. It was described by American biologist Ralph Vary Chamberlin in 1920.

Species
There are about 35 valid species:

 Australobius abbreviatus (Eason, 1978)
 Australobius anamagnus Ma, Song and Zhu, 2008
 Australobius apicicornis Qin, Lin, Zhao, Li, Xie, Ma, Su & Zhang, 2014
 Australobius auctus Chamberlin, 1944
 Australobius birmanicus (Pocock, 1891)
 Australobius cangshanensis Chao, Lee, Yang & Chang, 2020
 Australobius devertens (Trozina, 1894)
 Australobius discolor (Verhoeff, 1937)
 Australobius ethodes Chamberlin, 1939
 Australobius feae (Pocock, 1891)
 Australobius indicus (Eason, 1981)
 Australobius inflatitarsis (Eason, 1978)
 Australobius javanicus (Pocock, 1894)
 Australobius loriae (Silvestri, 1894)
 Australobius magnus (Trozina, 1894)
 Australobius malabarus Chamberlin, 1944
 Australobius malaccanus (Verhoeff K.W., 1937)
 Australobius malayicus (Verhoeff, 1937)
 Australobius maroneus (Attems, 1953)
 Australobius murphyi Wang, 1967
 Australobius nodulus Ma, Song & Zhu, 2008
 Australobius palnis (Eason, 1973)
 Australobius rectifrons (Attems, 1907)
 Australobius scabrior Chamberlin, 1920
 Australobius sculpturatus (Pocock, 1901)
 Australobius sechellarum (Brölemann, 1895)
 Australobius semperi (Haase, 1887)
 Australobius sumatranus (Silvestri, 1894)
 Australobius tenuiunguis (Eason, 1980)
 Australobius tetrophthalmus (Loksa, 1960)
 Australobius tracheoperspicuus Li, Pei, Guo, Ma, Chen, 2018
 Australobius tweedii (Verhoeff K.W., 1937)
 Australobius vians Chamberlin, 1938
 Australobius viduus Attems, 1932
 Australobius weberi (Pocock, 1894)

References

 

 
 
Centipede genera
Animals described in 1920
Taxa named by Ralph Vary Chamberlin